Nystølfjorden is a lake on the border of the municipalities of Birkenes and Froland in Agder county, Norway.  It is part of the Tovdalselva river drainage basin.  It flows into the Vågsdalsfjorden and eventually the Uldalsåna before emptying into the Herefossfjorden.

See also
List of lakes in Aust-Agder
List of lakes in Norway

References

Lakes of Agder
Birkenes
Froland